Derek Anthony Gillman (born 7 December 1952) was executive director and president of the Barnes Foundation from August 2006 to January 2014. In 2014 Gillman took up a position at Drexel University as a distinguished visiting professor in the Department of Art & Art History and the Museum Leadership graduate program, and is now distinguished teaching professor and executive director, university collections and exhibitions.

Education
Gillman was educated at Clifton College, Magdalen College, Oxford (MA), and the University of East Anglia (LLM, 1996). He is author of The Idea of Cultural Heritage  (Cambridge University Press 2nd ed., 2010)  and co-editor of The Preservation of Art and Culture in Times of War (Oxford University Press, 2022)

Career
Gillman served as president and director of the Pennsylvania Academy of the Fine Arts from 2001 to 2006.

References

1952 births
Living people
People educated at Clifton College
Alumni of Magdalen College, Oxford
Alumni of the University of East Anglia
American art curators